The Multi-Coloured Umbrella is an Australian play written by Barbara Vernon.

Plot
The play is set at a house in Bondi Beach belonging to the Donnellys, an upwardly mobile family who are bookmakers at Randwick Racecourse. The younger son, Joe, has troubles with his bride, Kate, a woman from a "good" family. Joe's brother Ben is in love with Kate. This leads to a fight between Joe and Ben.

Background
Vernon said she was inspired to write it when working as a radio announcer for 2NZ Inverell. She would read out ads for the local bookie which would say "do your punting under the multi-coloured umbrella". She thought about umbrellas and how they protected you from the light - just as some people can't see the light (their own motives) and have trouble clarifying their thought and action. "But don't think it throbs with psychology," said Vernon. "It's a comedy drama - a family play about ordinary people."

The role of Ben was specifically written for the actor Con Fardouly.

Theatre History
The play won second place in a 1957 contest for new plays, coming second to The Shifting Heart.

It was performed by amateur groups in the towns of Inverell, in the 2NZ drama club, which Vernon co-founded. It then had a run at the Little Theatre in Melbourne, before being given a professional production at the Theatre Royal in Sydney starting 9 November 1957.

The Sydney Morning Herald called it "much too slight a piece to keep the critical thunderstorms off... but sections of Saturday's first night audience certainly enjoyed its glossy magazine superficialities."

The production transferred to the Comedy Theatre in Melbourne the following month. The play had a different ending for its Sydney and Melbourne run.

The Passionate Pianist
Vernon later wrote a prequel about the same family, The Passionate Pianist.  This screened on the ABC.

1958 TV adaptation

An adaptation of the play was produced for Australian television in 1958. It was broadcast on the first night the ABC aired from their new studios at Gore Hill, Sydney

According to film reviewer Stephen Vagg "It took a genuine act of will to produce local stories for television and sometimes people were punished for doing so", giving Multi Coloured Umbrella as an example.

Cast
Edward Smith as Kevin
Georgie Sterling as Gloria
Ken Wayne as Joe
Deryck Barnes as Ben
Amber Mae Cecil as Katie

Production
The play was broadcast live on 29 January 1958 on ABC's Sydney station from its studios at Gore Hill. It was broadcast on the night the Gore Hill Studios opened. The bulk of the play was done live with some prerecorded scenes shot on location at Bondi Beach.

The play was selected by ABC's head of drama Neil Hutchinson. It was chosen to broadcast on the ABC the night the new £620,000 Gore Hill studios were opened. Chairman of the ABC Richard Boyer said "it is our greatest hope to make a contribution to Australian life and culture. We want to provide a medium to spread what is the genius of Australians."

Reception
It was advertised as "the exciting drama about present-day Sydney."

The Australian Women's Weekly called it "an excellent production".

Political controversy

The play was denounced by MLA W. R. Lawrence who said it "had all the evil elements one can imagine" and showed hysterical scenes, blasphemy of a low type and an immoral level of entertainment... If this is persisted in we can only expect to have difficult times, and unsettled and unhinged minds among our people."

There were calls of complaint to the station, one called claiming an actor said "Jesus, mama". This was denied by ABC's head of drama Neil Hutchinson who said the word was not in the script.

The chairman of the ABC, Richard Boyer, said he did not feel the broadcast could have offended public taste.  "The version tonight was abridged from the stage presentation," said Boyer. "The play is of the type of offering we hope to give and we hope will be accepted as worthwhile by the viewing public."

Hutchinson said "the play concerns a warm-hearted Christian Australian family. They are a bit rough and uncouth but their true solid Christian values emerge as the play progresses. Australia is just coming into its own in the drama field, which such plays as Summer of the Seventeenth Doll, The Shifting Heart and this play. In America top playwrights like Tennessee Williams are using realism to achieve authenticity in their plays. The Australian plays are doing this to but unlike the Americans and some of the prominent French authors they do not end on a note of despair."

The Sydney Morning Herald wrote an editorial calling Lawrence "an unmitigated bore" and Vernon "a serious playwright", claiming Lawrence was motivated by a desire for personal publicity.  Lawrence denied this.

Other church leaders and critics also complained about the play. One writer to the Herald called it "common and vulgar", another "sordid and moronic and in no way reflected the Australian way of life as most of us know it"; one said it would "drag Australia's name further into the gutter" and asked "why must everyone present the Australian scene in the degrading manner of Rusty Bugles, The Doll, Shifting Heart and Multi Coloured Umbrella. Other writers defended the play

George F. Kerr, who did the adaptation, defended the play in a letter to the editor of the Sydney Morning Herald, claiming that "It is perfectly possible for a play to be good and yet give offence to some... The writer of a good play is likely to have broken new ground, either in thought or technique, to have given the audience a fresh vision on a scene as seemingly familiar as a Bondi family group. But many people could do without this fresh vision; they resent being told that whereas they thought the world was flat, it is in fact round." He argued that the Donnellys of the play "are not the cosy Mr and Mrs Everybody of Bondi that many viewers may have expected to see on their screens see and, in all honesty, be bored by. The Donnellys are closer to the truth; like all of us from time to time, they are people in trouble.... Certainly this is not a cosy picture of the neighbours. But which is better? To lie about .them or, knowing the truth about their trouble, to be glad for their sake that they emerged from it?"

The play was kinescoped for Melbourne broadcast in February 1958. However, the planned Melbourne broadcast did not happen, as the kinescope recording ("telerecording") that was made of the broadcast was said to be "poor quality". The play was instead broadcast on Melbourne radio.

Radio adaptation
A version was also produced for Australian radio during 1958. There were versions in 1962 and 1969.

See also
The Passionate Pianist – 1957 television comedy one-off written by Barbara Vernon.
List of live television plays broadcast on Australian Broadcasting Corporation (1950s)

References

External links

Copy of script of 1958 TV adaptation at National Archives of Australia

1957 plays
Australian plays
1958 television plays
1950s Australian television plays
Australian Broadcasting Corporation original programming
English-language television shows
Black-and-white Australian television shows
Australian live television shows